The 143rd Airlift Squadron (143 AS) is a unit of the Rhode Island Air National Guard 143rd Airlift Wing located at Quonset Point Air National Guard Station, Rhode Island. The 143rd is equipped with the C-130J Hercules.

The squadron is a descendant organization of the 152nd Observation Squadron, established on 21 August 1939. It is one of the 29 original National Guard Observation Squadrons of the United States Army National Guard formed before World War II.

History
The origins of the 143rd Airlift Squadron begin in 1915 when concerned Rhode Island residents banded together in the true spirit of the citizen-soldier to purchase two Curtis Model "F" Flying Boats, one of which was assigned to the Rhode Island National Guard. The border conflict in Mexico and America's entry into the First World War prevented much use, and in 1919 the National Guard aircraft, now obsolete, was sold as surplus.

World War II
In 1939 President Roosevelt increased measures to prepare the Armed Forces for the inevitable American involvement in World War II. The State of Rhode Island was allocated one of only two new observation squadrons authorized by Congress that year. On 21 August 1939 the 152nd Observation Squadron was organized.  Less than one year later, on 25 November 1940 it was federalized for extended active duty. The training paid off. After American entry into World War II, the 152nd Observation Squadron immediately took up its primary mission of anti-submarine patrols along the Northeastern shipping lanes. In September 1944 the unit, now designated the 37th Photographic Reconnaissance Squadron, transferred overseas. Assigned to the Fifteenth Air Force, squadron pilots flew Photo Reconnaissance missions in northern Italy, southern Germany and the Balkans until June 1945, following the end of the war in Europe on 8 May 1945.

Rhode Island Air National Guard
The wartime 37th Photographic Reconnaissance Squadron was reactivated and re-designated as the 152nd Fighter Squadron, and was allotted to the Rhode Island Air National Guard, on 24 May 1946. It was organized at T. F. Green Municipal Airport, Warwick, Rhode Island and was extended federal recognition on 152nd Fighter-Bomber Squadron as the 152nd Fighter-Bomber Squadron by the National Guard Bureau. The 152nd Fighter-Bomber Squadron was entitled to the history, honors, and colors of the 37th. The squadron was equipped with F-47 Thunderbolts and was assigned to the Continental Air Command First Air Force.

Air defense

In 1952 the 152nd was transferred to Air Defense Command, given a mission of air defense for Rhode Island, eastern Long Island and over the Atlantic approaches of New York City.  In order to accomplish this, the unit was equipped with long-range F-51D Mustangs.  In 1956 the United States Air Force, in an effort to upgrade to an all jet fighter force, required Air National Guard Aerospace Defense Command units to upgrade to jet-powered aircraft. The Rhode Island Airport Commission and National Guard authorities found themselves in a conflict over the use of T.F. Green Municipal Airport for tactical jet operations. Unable to resolve these differences the Air Force inactivated the squadron and the National Guard Bureau transferred the 152nd Fighter Interceptor Squadron to the Arizona Air National Guard.

However, the National Guard Bureau's desire to have an Air National Guard flying unit located in every state brought a new mission and the numeric designation to the Rhode Island Air National Guard, the 143rd Air Resupply Squadron using propeller-driven aircraft. The 143rd Air Resupply Squadron was bestowed the lineage and history of the inactivated Rhode Island ANG 152nd Fighter Interceptor Squadron.  The 152nd FIS, now part of the Arizona Air National Guard was granted federal recognition as a new organization, with no history or lineage to the Rhode Island Air National Guard.

Special operations
The 143rd Air Resupply Squadron was assigned to the Military Air Transport Service.  It was designated at the time as a "Psychological Warfare" unit which supported USAF unconventional warfare (guerrilla warfare), direct action (commando-type raids), strategic reconnaissance (intelligence gathering), and PSYWAR operations.  The unit was assigned the Grumman SA-16A Albatross seaplane and for a short time retained the Douglas C-47 Skytrain. There were several minor mission designation changes, and the C-47 was eventually replaced by the Curtis C-46 Commando.

In 1963 the first major mission change for the 143rd occurred. Situations around the world produced a need for specialized units which could insert a small group of trained combat troops on land or sea anywhere at a moments notice. The 143rd was tasked as one of the representatives of the National Guard in the Air Force's Air Commando Group structure. The C-46 was replaced with Helio U-10A and U-10D Couriers. During a three-year period starting in 1965, the U-10s belonging to the 143rd and other Air National Guard units were transferred back to the Air Force for use in South Vietnam, during which the "Helio" was replaced by DeHavilland U-6 "Beavers".

In 1968 the U-10s returned from their tour of duty in South Vietnam, and on 1 July, the Rhode Island Air National Guard 143rd Special Operations Squadron was authorized to expand to a group level.  The 143rd Special Operations Group was established by the National Guard Bureau, with the 143rd SOS becoming the group's flying squadron. Other squadrons assigned into the group were the 143rd Headquarters, 143rd Material Squadron (Maintenance), 143rd Combat Support Squadron, and the 143rd USAF Dispensary.

The Grumman SA-16 "Albatross" flown by 143rd pilots since 1955 was replaced in 1968 with an updated version of the "Albatross", the HU-16. With twice the cargo capability and range, the HU-16 opened up new avenues of opportunity as was demonstrated in 1970. Flight and Ground crews of the 143rd assisted scientists and engineers of the Naval Underwater Systems Center, conducting studies of undersea acoustics, at Lake Tanganyika in Africa during April and again in August at Hudson Bay, Canada.

The unit would work in the Special Operations field for seven more years, during which the HU-16 aircraft were eventually retired in 1972 and replaced with Fairchild C-119G/L "Flying Boxcars".

Tactical airlift
In 1975 as part of a general program to upgrade Air National Guard units the 143rd was redesignated as a Tactical Airlift Group and assigned Lockheed C-130A Hercules aircraft.  In 1980 the 143rd Tactical Airlift Group moved from T.F. Green airport to its new home at Quonset Air National Guard Base.

As global airlifters, Rhode Island "Herks" were found in all parts of the United States, Europe, Africa, South America and the Caribbean. The 143rd played a vital role in deployments such as Volant Oak, Volant Pine, Red Flag, Dragon Hammer, Volant Rodeo competitions and humanitarian efforts such as "Operation Toy Lift" which provided toys to the children of Granada in 1986. In 1989, the 143rd was selected for conversion to the C-130E Model.

In 1990 unit volunteers provided support during Operation Desert Shield. In September, unit members flew out of Rhein-Main Air Base, Germany to support operational missions from Turkey and Saudi Arabia. The second group of volunteers arrived at RAF Mildenhall, England in January 1991 and was in the theater of operations when Operation Desert Shield turned into Operation Desert Storm. With the defeat of the Iraqi forces and the end of the Gulf War, members returned home in June 1991 and were released from active duty.

As part of Air Mobility Command the unit continued to be called upon to support State, Federal, and UN activities throughout the world. Volunteers from the 143rd participated in many United Nations relief missions; Somalia in 1992, Operation Provide Promise in 1993 flying daylight air-land missions into Sarajevo along with night airdrops over remote areas of Bosnia-Herzegovina.

On 1 October 1995 the group was elevated to Wing status. In 1998 the Air Force formed the Expeditionary Air Force (EAF); smaller sized war fighting "packages" able to rapidly respond to regional conflicts. The Wing has participated in five AEF cycles, supporting Operation Joint Forge in the Balkans, Operation Southern Watch in Southwest Asia and Coronet Oak in South America.

Current operations
On 11 September 2001, the 143rd responded to the call again, deploying unit members to Ground Zero, to US bases for homeland security and implemented 24-hour operations at Quonset.   The 143rd AW has supported the Global War on Terror by not only becoming a bridge to and from the theater but by also providing airlift in support of the war effort. The 143rd AW provided the first-ever C-130J Aircraft in a combat role by the U.S. Air Force in December 2004 and continued to support the war effort with both the C-130E and C-130J until retiring the C-130E in 2005. The 143rd AW also provided and continues to provide the much needed troop support within Southwest Asia and many other areas of the world.

In December 2001, the 143rd received its first C-130J-30. The Wing became the first in the Air Force to receive the "stretch" version of the "J" model. As the most modern tactical airlifter in the world, the C-130J-30 can carry more cargo or personnel farther, faster, and more economically than the C-130E proving its increased airlift capability. The fleet for the 143rd was completed with the arrival of the eighth J-model at Quonset on 15 June 2007.

Lineage

 Designated 152nd Observation Squadron, and allotted to Rhode Island NG, on 21 August 1939
 Activated on 13 October 1939.
 Ordered to active service on 25 November 1940
 Re-designated: 152nd Observation Squadron (Medium) on 13 January 1942
 Re-designated: 152nd Observation Squadron on 4 July 1942
 Re-designated: 152nd Reconnaissance Squadron (Bombardment) on 2 April 1943
 Re-designated: 152nd Reconnaissance Squadron (Fighter) on 15 June 1943
 Re-designated: 152nd Tactical Reconnaissance Squadron on 11 August 1943
 Re-designated: 37th Photographic Mapping Squadron on 9 October 1943
 Re-designated: 37th Photographic Reconnaissance Squadron on 29 March 1944
 Inactivated on 6 November 1945
 Re-designated: 152nd Fighter Squadron, and allotted to Rhode Island ANG, on 24 May 1946
 Re-designated: 152nd Fighter-Bomber Squadron, and received federal recognition, 1 September 1948
 Re-designated: 152nd Fighter-Interceptor Squadron, 1 September 1952
 Inactivated on 30 June 1956
 Re-designated: 143r Air Resupply Squadron and activated 1 November 1956
 Re-designated: 143rd Air Commando Squadron, 1 July 1963
 Re-designated: 143rd Special Operations Squadron, 1 July 1968
 Re-designated: 143rd Tactical Airlift Squadron, 1 October 1975
 Re-designated: 143rd Airlift Squadron, 16 March 1992

Assignments
 Rhode Island National Guard, 13 October 1939
 First Corps Area, 25 November 1940
 VI Army Corps, 30 December 1940
 26th Observation (later Reconnaissance) Group, 1 September 1941
 73rd Reconnaissance (later Tactical Reconnaissance) Group, 27 June 1943
 69th Tactical Reconnaissance Group, 9 October 1943
 II Tactical Air Division, 29 March 1944
 I (later III) Tactical Air Division, 12 April 1944
 5th Photographic (later Reconnaissance) Group, 15 November 1944 – 28 October 1945
 102nd Fighter Group, 1 September 1948
 102nd Fighter Wing, 1 November 1950
 102nd Fighter-Interceptor Wing, 1 September 1952 – 30 June 1956
 Rhode Island Air National Guard, 1 November 1956
 Gained by: Military Air Transport Service
 Gained by: Tactical Air Command, 1 July 1963
 143rd Special Operations Group, 1 July 1968
 143rd Tactical Airlift Group, 1 October 1975
 143rd Operations Group, 1 October 1995 – Present

Stations

 Hillsgrove Army Airfield, Rhode Island, 13 October 1939
 Fort Devens Airfield, Massachusetts, 31 July 1941
 Reading Army Airfield, Pennsylvania, 8 June 1943
 Camp Campbell Army Airfield, Kentucky, 27 June 1943
 Esler Field, Louisiana, 20 November 1943
 Muskogee Army Airfield, Oklahoma, 12 Apr – 3 October 1943
 Capodichino Airport, Naples, Italy, 18 November 1944
 San Severo Airfield, Italy, 12 December 1944

 Bari Airfield, Italy, 8 August 1945
 Capodichino Airport, Naples, Italy, 17 Sep – 18 October 1945
 Camp Patrick Henry, Virginia, 6 November 1945
 Theodore Francis Green Airport, Rhode Island, 1 September 1948 – 30 June 1956; 1 November 1956
 Quonset State Airport, Rhode Island, 1 October 1980
 Designated: Quonset Point Air National Guard Station, Rhode Island, 1991–Present.

Aircraft

 Douglas O-38, 1939–1941
 O-47, 1939–1942
 O-52 Owl, 1941–1943
 Douglas O-46, 1941–1943
 Stinson O-49, 1941–1943
 Aeronca O-58, 1941–1943
 O-59, 1941–1943
 A-20 Havoc, 1943–1944
 B-25 Mitchell, 1943–1944
 P-39 Airacobra, 1943–1944
 F-5 Lightning, 1944–1945
 F-47 Thunderbolt, 1948–1952

 F-51 Mustang, 1952–1956
 SA-16 Albatross, 1956–1968
 C-47 Skytrain, 1956–1957
 C-46 Commando, 1957–1963
 U-10D Super Courier, 1963–1965; 1968–1975
 U-6 Beaver, 1965–1968
 HU-16 Albatross, 1968–1972
 C-119 Flying Boxcar, 1972–1975
 C-130A Hercules, 1975–1989
 C-130E Hercules, 1989–2005
 C-130J Hercules, 2004–Present

See also

 List of observation squadrons of the United States Army National Guard

References

 Rogers, B. (2006). United States Air Force Unit Designations Since 1978. 
 Globalsecurity.org 143rd Airlift Group
 143rd Airlift Wing Factsheet
 Cornett, Lloyd H; Johnson, Mildred W (1980). A Handbook of Aerospace Defense Organization, 1946–1980. Peterson AFB, CO: Office of History, Aerospace Defense Center.
 5

External links

Squadrons of the United States Air National Guard
North Kingstown, Rhode Island
Washington County, Rhode Island
143
Military units and formations in Rhode Island